Dr. Frederick J. Frese III (October 3, 1940 - July 16, 2018) was an American psychologist, and an advocate for the mentally ill. In 1968, Fred was diagnosed with schizophrenia, and ordered to live the rest of his life in the Ohio State Psychiatric System. In 1980, Frese was promoted to the Director of Psychology of the Western Reserve Psychiatric Rehabilitation Center. In 1988, Frese began speaking publicly about his experiences as a "sometimes-psychotic psychologist", and over the course of 30 years gave 2,000 speeches in 47 states and several countries. In 2005, Frese was featured as one of CNN's "Wellness Warriors".

Career
Frese served in the U.S. Marine Corps from 1962 to 1966, achieving the rank of Captain. In March, 1966 Fred was diagnosed with schizophrenia and involuntarily committed. Over the next ten years, Frese had several schizophrenia-related breakdowns, and was institutionalized nine times in six states. Frese received his PhD in psychology in 1979, and worked as the Director of Psychology at the Western Reserve Psychiatric Rehabilitation Center from 1980 to 1993. After revealing his diagnosis during a major speech at the annual convention of the American Psychological Association, Frese began his career as an advocate for the rights of the mentally ill. He held numerous advocacy positions, including Founding Chairman of Community and State Hospital Psychologists, a section of Division 18 of the American Psychological Association;  President of the National Mental Health Consumer Association; and a member of American Psychological Association Task Force for the Seriously Mentally Ill. He served on the board of directors for several organizations, including The American Occupational Therapy Association (1995-1998), National Alliance on Mental Illness (1995-2009), and the Treatment Advocacy Center. and was the founding president of the APA's section for psychologists serving persons with serious mental illness. Dr. Frese served as a consultant to the Department of Veterans Affairs, to NIMH, and to SAMHSA's Center for Mental Health Services. He has testified before several congressional committees on mental health service priorities. He published extensively, and was on the advisory review boards of professional journals, including Schizophrenia Bulletin. He delivered more than 2000 invited presentations on serious mental illness in some 48 states as well as in Canada, Japan, Australia and Europe. He has appeared on CNN, NPR, Nightline, the ABC Evening News, and has co-produced a widely distributed training video about coping with schizophrenia.

Family History 
Fred Frese was the oldest of the five children born to Dr. Frederick Joseph Frese Jr. and Katheryn Ruth Sullivan Frese. Frese's father was a scientist with the military's space medicine program, and moved with his family to military bases around the country, but Frese spent the majority of his childhood near San Antonio, Texas.
In 1976, Fred met Penelope (Penny) Anne Schnitter, a fellow graduate student at Ohio University in Athens, Ohio. During the early part of their friendship, Frese did not reveal his status as a person with schizophrenia, nor did Penny mention her status as a Franciscan nun. Once their relationship progressed, both revealed their unique backgrounds. The two were married in 1977 and raised four children. Fred credited his success to his stable, loving relationship with Penny.

References

External links
 Bio on Dr. Frese from Psychlaws.org
 Bio on Dr. Frese from NAMI
 Dr. Frese's official Homepage

1940 births
2018 deaths
People from Akron, Ohio
People from Hudson, Ohio
Scientists with disabilities
21st-century American psychologists
People with schizophrenia
Activists from Ohio
20th-century American psychologists